Anna Ceselie Brustad Moe (born 8 May 1975) is a Norwegian politician for the Centre Party.

She served as a deputy representative to the Norwegian Parliament from Nord-Trøndelag during the term 2005–2009. In 2008, when regular representative Lars Peder Brekk was appointed to the second cabinet Stoltenberg, Brustad moved up to a regular seat.

On the local level Brustad has been a member of Frosta municipal council.

She is married to fellow MP Ola Borten Moe.

References

1975 births
Living people
Members of the Storting
Centre Party (Norway) politicians
Politicians from Nord-Trøndelag
People from Frosta
Women members of the Storting
21st-century Norwegian politicians
21st-century Norwegian women politicians